Happenstance, a portmanteau of happening and circumstance, may refer to:

Film and TV
Happenstance (film), a 2000 French film by Laurent Firode
"Happenstance" (CSI), a season seven episode of the American crime drama CSI

Music
Happenstance (Fozzy album), a 2002 album
Happenstance (Rachael Yamagata album), a 2004 album
"Happenstance", a song by The dB's from their 1982 album Repercussion
"Happenstance", a song by Miles Kane from the album Colour of the Trap

Other
Happenstance, a novel by Canadian author Carol Shields